John Wayles (January 31, 1715 – May 28, 1773) was a colonial American planter, slave trader and lawyer in colonial Virginia. He is historically best known as the father-in-law of Thomas Jefferson, the third president of the United States. Wayles married three times, with these marriages producing eleven children; only five of them lived to adulthood. 
Wayles' continual rapes of slave Betty Hemings resulted in six additional children, including Sally Hemings, who was the mother of six children by Thomas Jefferson and half-sister of Martha Jefferson.

Early life and education
Wayles was born in the city of  Lancaster on January 31, 1715. The young Wayles likely became aware of the burgeoning transatlantic slave trade and "its ability to make merchants rich". Wayles emigrated as a young man to the Virginia Colony, likely during the 1730s.

Career
Wayles received his licence to practice law in Virginia in 1741, entering into the profession the very same year. He began his legal career by traveling on horseback to plantations in the Tidewater, where he obtained work creating legal documents. He was also a prosecuting attorney in Henrico County. In Virginia, Wayles became part of the planter elite. His plantation, called "The Forest", was located in Charles City County.

Eventually becoming a slave trader, Wayles earned a fortune from the institution of slavery. He arranged for tobacco sales between planters in Virginia and buyers in Europe. In addition to these businesses, Wayles also worked as an agent for Farrell and Jones of Bristol, included performing debt collection. During the period leading up to the Revolutionary War, the tobacco economy was unstable and laws made the tobacco trade difficult for Wayles to conduct tobacco trade and collect debts. The economic and legal constraints led to the "bankruptcy of the Virginia plantation system". Jefferson began legal work for Wayles in 1768.

Personal life

Marriages and children 
On May 3, 1746, Wayles married Martha Eppes (born on April 10, 1721 at Bermuda Hundred), the daughter of Colonel Francis Epps. She was a young widow. 

Their children were:

Twins, a girl and a boy, who died within hours of their birth on December 23, 1746. 

Martha, born on October 31, 1748,  the couple's only child to survive to adulthood. 

The infant's 27 year-old mother died six days later on November 5, 1748. 

Secondly, Wayles married Tabitha Cocke, of Malvern Hill, also of the planter class.  They had several children:
Sarah, did not survive to adulthood.
Elizabeth, born February 24, 1752; married Francis Eppes, the first cousin or nephew of John Wayles first wife, Martha Epps Wayles. Elizabeth and Francis Epps had two sons, Richard and John Wayles Eppes, the latter of whom married Thomas Jefferson's second daughter, Mary Jefferson.
Tabitha, born November 16, 1753; and
Anne, born August 26, 1756, married Henry Skipwith (born 1751).
Wayles' second wife died sometime between August 1756 and January 1760.

On January 26, 1760, Wayles married his third wife, Elizabeth Lomax Skelton (she was the widow of Reuben Skelton, an older brother of Bathurst Skelton, his daughter Martha's first husband). The couple had no issue; she died on February 10, 1761.

Betty Hemings and children
As part of the wedding settlement between John Wayles and Martha Epps, her parents gave the new couple an enslaved African-American woman and her young mixed-race daughter Betty Hemings, whose father was an English sea captain named Hemings.  After the death of his third wife, Wayles began a relationship with 26 year-old Betty Hemings. Betty already had four children: Mary, Martin, Betty Brown, and Nance.

Wayles fathered six children on slave Betty Hemings.  Children that were the offspring of slaves and the slave owner were sometimes called "a shadow family":
 Robert,
 James,
 Critta,
 Thenia,
 Peter, and
 Sally Hemings.

As their mother was a slave, the children were all born into slavery under the principle of partus sequitur ventrum, which had been part of the law since 1662.  They were three-quarters European in ancestry and half-siblings to Wayles' daughters by his wives.

Wayles was not known to acknowledge his children by Betty, nor did he free her or them in his will. To do so would have communicated his relationship with Betty and would have required a change in Virginia manumission laws at that time. He did, though, allow certain freedoms for his children. For instance his two oldest children were taught to read and write, allowed to earn their own money, and allowed to travel by themselves. The youngest boy, Peter, was three years old when Wayles died.

Hemings had two more children while she lived at Monticello named John and Lucy.

Death and estate settlement

John Wayles died at age 58 in 1773.  He left substantial property, including many slaves, but the estate was encumbered with debt.  Upon Wayles' death, Betty Hemings and her six children with John Wayles were moved "without hesitancy" to Monticello to prevent the Hemings from being separated.

The estate was worth £30,000, but Wayles was in debt to Farrell and Jones for £11,000. Wayles' three sons-in-law, including Thomas Jefferson, decided to break up the estate and its debts. Martha and her husband Thomas Jefferson inherited the Willis Creek and Elk Hill plantations and a total of 135 slaves, including members of the Hemings family. They also inherited £4,000 in debt. Jefferson and other co-executors of the Wayles estate worked for years to clear the debt.

Notes

References

Sources

Nash, Gary B.; Hodges, Graham R.G. (2008), Friends of Liberty: Thomas Jefferson, Tadeusz Kosciuszko, and Agrippa Hull. A Tale of Three Patriots, Two Revolutions, and A Tragic Betrayal Of Freedom In The New Nation, pp. 129–130, New York: Basic Books

Further reading
Annette Gordon-Reed (1997/1998), Thomas Jefferson and Sally Hemings:  An American Controversy, reprint with new foreword about DNA evidence, Charlottesville, VA:  University of Virginia Press.   
Annette Gordon-Reed, (2008), The Hemingses of Monticello: An American Family, New York: W.W. Norton & Company, Inc.
 Robert F. Turner (2001/2011),  The Jefferson-Hemings Controversy: Report of the Scholars Commission , Durham,NC:  Carolina Academic Press.
Cynthia H. Burton (2005),  Jefferson Vindicated: Fallacies, Omissions, and Contradictions in the Hemings Genealogical Search "", Charlottesville, VA: Self published.

External links
"Getting Word; African Americans at Monticello", Plantation & Slavery'', Monticello

1715 births
1773 deaths
American slave owners
American slave traders
American people of English descent
Virginia colonial people
People from Lancaster, Lancashire
Hemings family